Farmar is a surname. Notable people with the surname include:

Jordan Farmar (born 1986), American basketball player
Leo Farmar (1878–1907), British botanist
Robert Farmar (1717–1778), British Army officer

See also
Farmer (surname)